E. exigua may refer to:

 Eatoniella exigua, a sea snail
 Elachista exigua, a grass-miner moth
 Eleogiton exigua, a flowering plant
 Entodina exigua, a land snail
 Eolis exigua, a sea slug
 Eragrostis exigua, a true grass
 Eublemma exigua, an owlet moth
 Eucalyptus exigua, a flowering plant
 Eulechria exigua, a concealer moth
 Eulima exigua, a sea snail
 Euphorbia exigua, a flowering plant
 Evalea exigua, a sea snail